Coprosma wallii, is a rare shrub found in New Zealand.

Coprosma wallii grows to 3 metres high in a range of habitats, including alluvial forest, riparian forest, grey and sub-alpine scrub.

References

wallii
Flora of New Zealand
Endangered flora of New Zealand